National Transport Corporation is a parastatal bus operator in Mauritius. The company operates 430 buses. There are 65 bus routes, some of which carry 21,000 passengers daily. The National Transport Corporation has Many Routes to Vacoas, Rose Hill, Riv.des Galets, Souillac, R.Rempart, Curepipe, Port Louis, Q.Bornes, St.Pierre and Chemin Grenier.

External links
 NTC

Transport companies of Mauritius